Kevin Wicks is a fictional character from the BBC soap opera EastEnders, played by Phil Daniels. Kevin made his first appearance on February 17, 2006, when he was introduced onto the show alongside his two children, Carly (Kellie Shirley) and Deano (Matt Di Angelo). He is presented as the nephew of a long-running character, Pat Butcher (Pam St. Clement). Kevin, a wheeler-dealer, is described as caring, sensitive, and a cheeky chap.

It was announced on August 18, 2007, that Daniels had decided not to renew his contract. This resulted in his character, Kevin, being killed off in a car crash on December 31, 2007, in the show. He is last seen in the next episode, broadcast on January 1, 2008, when his wife Denise Fox (Diane Parish) goes to visit his corpse.

Storylines

Backstory
Kevin married Shirley Carter (Linda Henry) and had one son with her named Jimbo (Lloyd Richards), who had cystic fibrosis. Shirley, had several affairs while married to Kevin and became pregnant twice; Kevin was not their father. Kevin brought Shirley's children, Carly (Kellie Shirley) and Deano (Matt Di Angelo), up as his own. However, Shirley found parenting challenging; she abandoned Kevin in 1989, leaving him a single parent. Jimbo eventually died from his illness; Shirley failed to return for his funeral and did not contact her surviving children.

2006–2008
Kevin follows Deano to Walford, in February 2006, and stays with his aunt, Pat Evans (Pam St Clement). Kevin plans to emigrate but gets involved in Carly's marital break-up and decides to stay in Walford and support his children, taking over management of the local car lot.

Despite an acrimonious introduction to Denise Fox (Diane Parish) in May 2006, she mistakes him for Grant Mitchell (Ross Kemp) and accuses him of sleeping with her daughter Chelsea (Tiana Benjamin). They realize they are attracted to each other and start dating but Kevin struggles to cope with Denise's temper. Seeing a more vulnerable side of her, Kevin is convinced to persevere. It is a volatile romance and Denise ends it several times resulting in Kevin being pursued by Elaine Jarvis (Siân Reeves). Kevin supports Denise through the abuse of her ex-husband Owen Turner (Lee Ross), so the couple reunite and move in together. In late 2006, the Wicks family go on holiday to Dorset. Kevin's ex-wife, Shirley, finds them and tries to reunite with her children, Deano and Carly, until Kevin orders her to leave them alone. Shirley refuses and follows them to Walford in January 2007, and reveals her true identity, causing problems. When Kevin tries to make her leave, Shirley threatens to tell her children that Kevin is not their father. The truth eventually comes out and both Carly and Deano shun Kevin. Deano eventually forgives Kevin for lying, but Carly will not. Devastated, Kevin leaves Walford, not telling anyone where he is going and is missing for several months, it is later confirmed he is alive after bank records show he emptied his account in Hastings. He goes to Dungeness and plans to go to France, but after meeting a man named Jed (Burn Gorman) - who steals his ferry tickets and dies in a bus crash - Kevin goes home. When Carly rejects him again, he turns to Shirley for comfort and has sex with her. Kevin regrets it and makes Shirley promise to keep the tryst secret. Kevin manages to rebuild his relationship with his children, proposes to Denise, and they marry in April 2007, despite Shirley trying to ruin the day - she turns up at the ceremony and tells Denise about their recent tryst, only to find Kevin has already told her.

Kevin has to endure numerous upsets involving his family, including the imprisonment of Deano and Chelsea. They try to frame Sean Slater (Robert Kazinsky) for the assault of Patrick Trueman (Rudolph Walker). Kevin tries to protect them by destroying CCTV footage that shows the real culprit is Craig Dixon (Rory Jennings). However, Carly copies the tape and gives it to the police. Deano and Chelsea are found guilty of attempting to pervert the course of justice and are imprisoned.

In December 2007, Kevin agreed to sell cars for Phil Mitchell (Steve McFadden), unaware they were stolen. When he discovers this, he decides to continue selling them as he wants money for a new house, his family, and around a world trip for Deano. Phil later learns from Jack Branning (Scott Maslen) that the cars are dangerous "cut-and-shuts" and tells Kevin to get rid of them. However, Denise has sold one of the cars to Yolande Trueman (Angela Wynter), so on New Year's Eve 2007, Kevin tries to steal Yolande's car and destroy it. His plans are jeopardized by Shirley, who threatens to tell the police unless he persuades Carly to talk to her. Unable to get rid of Shirley, Kevin throws her into the car, planning to take it to a junkyard to be crushed. However, the vehicle is low on petrol, and they cannot get to their destination, so Kevin and Shirley decide to race the car in circles and then set it alight, making it look like the work of joyriding vandals. While Kevin races dangerously in the car, Shirley goads him to go faster; he drives off at high speed, but the car bonnet flies open, and Kevin loses control and crashes into debris, leaving him impaled by a metal pole. Kevin lives for a few minutes, and he and Shirley talk together; she attempts to keep him alive but fails, and he dies in her arms. Kevin's body is taken to the mortuary, where Denise kisses him at midnight, wishing him Happy New Year. Kevin's funeral was held in January 2008, but the hearse broke down, resulting in Kevin's friends and family carrying his coffin to the crematorium. Denise revealed in June that she and Carly had scattered Kevin's ashes in the South China Sea.

Kevin's voice (recorded by Phil Daniels) is heard in a family video watched by Shirley in May 2014 and again in June 2015.

Creation and development 
Kevin Wicks's character and casting were announced on 28 September 2005. The feeling was said to "rev up" EastEnders, and the actor, Phil Daniels, would start filming his first scenes in January 2006, with them airing in February. The script writers had planned to make the new addition to the Wicks family "a force to be reckoned with", especially with Kevin's hooligan son, Deano (Matt Di Angelo), who was the first of the family to be seen on-screen.

Sources described Kevin as a "good-hearted family man." Daniels went on to say of his casting, "I'm looking forward to the challenge of doing some quality mainstream TV." EastEnders producer Kate Harwood added, "Phil Daniels is an extraordinary talent. It is a real coup to have him join the show". Daniels also spoke of how he, and his mother, were big fans of the soap.

References

External links 
 

EastEnders characters
Fictional businesspeople
Fictional salespeople
Television characters introduced in 2006
Male characters in television
Carter family (EastEnders)